Three's a Crowd is an album from Matt Tilley.  Released November 10, 2007, it takes prank calls from his radio show into CD format. It was certified Gold by ARIA.

Track listing

Disc 1
 "The Lolliop Lady" - (5:21)
 "The Political Party Dudes" - (6:14)
 "Say It Don't Spray It" - (6:58)
 "Air Marshall Addis" - (5:42)
 "Cry Baby" - (4:38)
 "Someone Goes Bang!" - (4:54)
 "Restaurant Runner" - (7:19)
 "Superfan" - (5:18)
 "Taken For A (Bus) Ride" - (6:05)
 "Stolen Property" - (5:02)
 "Dwarf Throwing" - (5:25)
 "You Dumb Mother" - (3:15)
 "Barnesy Bribes Blue Boys" - (5:58)
 "I Am Not A Horse" - (5:35)

Disc 2
 "(Meet Arjib & Cecil)" - (0:20)
 "Servicing A Customer" - (6:02)
 "Flu Shots" - (11:38)
 "The Censorship Chook" - (3:12)
 "The Naked Truth" - (7:13)
 "I'm Hearing Voices" - (8:34)
 "C Is For Colnoscopy" - (5:23)
 "The House Of Troy (again)" - (6:18)
 "Dead And Buried" - (5:23)
 "Heartless" - (5:20)
 "What Goes Bang" - (8:14)
 "Flushed With Success" - (4:59)
 "The Blue Danube Waltz" - (2:23)

Charts

Certifications

References

2007 albums
Matt Tilley albums